Jang Mun-hyu  was a military commander of Balhae Korea in the 8th century under the reign of King Mu. He is noted for the naval assault against Tang China in 732.

Military Campaign against Tang dynasty
King Mu son of Dae jo yeong of Balhae was known for the audacity that he demonstrated against Tang. Balhae embattled Tang over the Issue of Heuksu Malgal tribes.  When the Heuksu Malgal in the north of Balhae came under the influence of Tang in 727, he attacked the Heuksu Malgal fearing a pincer attack. To prevent further contacts between Tang and its allies, Heuksu Malgal tribes, King Mu ordered his commander Jang  Mun-hyu to attack Dengzhou in Shandong Peninsula. As a result of the a naval assault launched by him in 732, the city's Chinese prefect, Wei  Jun (偉俊) was killed. Dengzhou was occupied for short time by his forces, before his tactical retreat from the city.

See also
North South States Period
Military history of Korea

Notes

References
The academy of Korean studies

Balhae people
Military history of Korea
8th-century Korean people